This is a list of all the American golfers who have played in the Walker Cup through 2021. Jay Sigel holds the record with nine appearances.

Players 

^ In the final team but did not play in any matches.
+ Selected for the team but withdrew and was replaced. Allen Doyle was selected but withdrew shortly before the event because of injury.

Ryder Cup players
The following 37 American Walker Cup players have subsequently played in the Ryder Cup:

Tommy Aaron, Bryson DeChambeau, David Duval, Brad Faxon, Rickie Fowler, Fred Haas, Jay Haas, Scott Hoch, J. B. Holmes, Dustin Johnson, Anthony Kim, Tom Kite, Matt Kuchar, Justin Leonard, Gene Littler, Davis Love III, Phil Mickelson, Ryan Moore, Bob Murphy, Jack Nicklaus, Jeff Overton, Jerry Pate, Corey Pavin, Chris Riley, Bill Rogers, Mason Rudolph, Scott Simpson, Webb Simpson, Jordan Spieth, Craig Stadler, Curtis Strange, Hal Sutton, Justin Thomas, Ken Venturi, Scott Verplank, Lanny Wadkins, Tiger Woods.

See also 

Golf in the United States
List of Great Britain and Ireland Walker Cup golfers
Lists of golfers

References

American
Walker Cup, America
Walker Cup, America
 Walker Cup
Walker
Golf